Jaime Patricio Ramírez Manríquez (born 3 March 1967 in Santiago de Chile) is a Chilean former football player.

International career
After having taken part of the Chile at under-20 level, he made his debut for the Chile senior team on 13 September 1988 in a friendly match against Ecuador.

Honours
Unión Española
 Copa Invierno: 1989

Colo-Colo
 Chilean Primera División: 1991

References

External links

 Jaime Ramírez at PartidosdeLaRoja 
 Jaime Ramírez at playmakerstats.com (English version of ceroacero.es)

1967 births
Living people
Footballers from Santiago
Chilean footballers
Chile international footballers
Chile under-20 international footballers
Chilean expatriate footballers
Association football midfielders
Unión Española footballers
FC Sion players
Colo-Colo footballers
Deportes Concepción (Chile) footballers
Atlético Morelia players
Toros Neza footballers
Universidad de Chile footballers
Chilean Primera División players
Swiss Super League players
Liga MX players
1989 Copa América players
Chilean expatriate sportspeople in Switzerland
Chilean expatriate sportspeople in Mexico
Expatriate footballers in Switzerland
Expatriate footballers in Mexico